Kaalia is a 1981 Indian Hindi-language action thriller film, written and directed by Tinnu Anand, and produced by Iqbal Singh. The film stars Amitabh Bachchan (in the title role), Parveen Babi, Asha Parekh, Kader Khan, Pran, Amjad Khan, K.N. Singh and Jagdeep. The music is by R.D. Burman, while the lyrics are by Majrooh Sultanpuri.

The film was the 8th highest grossing Indian film of 1981. 

It was later remade in Kannada in 1984 as Huliyaada Kaala starring Tiger Prabhakar and in Tamil in 1987 as Cooliekkaran starring Vijayakanth.

The film was another classic from Bachchan's "angry young man" era and helped cement his status as a superstar. The film is also remembered for having the classic upbeat song "Jahan Teri Yeh Nazar Hai" (sung by Kishore Kumar). It continues to be played at parties and nightclubs, along with being considered one of the most iconic songs of the 1980s. This was the only film that featured Amitabh Bachchan and Asha Parekh together, although they were never paired opposite each other.

Plot

Kaalia lives with his older brother Shamu, sister-in-law Shanti, and their little daughter Munni. He is intelligent but spends his time idly playing with the neighbour's kids. His older brother gets into an accident while at work at the mill and loses his arms. He loses his job and needs money for his treatment. Kaalia begs his brother's boss, Shahani Seth, for monetary help, but he refuses. Kaalia breaks into Shahani's safe to get the money, but it proves to be too late as Shamu dies. Shahani then throws Kaalia in jail for nine months, where he meets the men that teach him crime.

After his release, Kaalia is a different, stronger man. He and his accomplices steal the gold that the boss had been smuggling at the mill. Then he burns down the mill as retribution for his brother's death. He goes to jail again, this time for two years. His accomplices lie to his sister-in-law by telling her that he is in America earning money for her and her daughter. They move from poverty to riches. In jail, Kaalia meets the jailor Raghvir Singh, a smart, ethical, strong man, whose daughter was kidnapped by one of the prisoners as a child. After Kaalia is released from prison, he is bent on seeking vengeance and eventually pairs up with a woman names Shalini.

The boss kidnaps Kaalia's niece and forces her mother to testify against Kaalia at a murder trial. He is found guilty for a murder he didn't commit and escapes from prison to find his niece. At first, the warden chases him, but once he knows the true story, decides to help him. They go to the boss's place and not only find the little girl, but also the sister-in-law about to die. The boss reveals to the warden that he was the one who had kidnapped his daughter 20 years ago and now it is the grown up Shalini. They fight with him, the boss gets beaten up, and Kaalia finally chops Shahani's arm off.

Cast 

Amitabh Bachchan as Kallu / Kaalia
Asha Parekh as Shanti (Kallu's sister-in-law)
Parveen Babi as Shalini / Rani Singh
Kader Khan as Shamu (Kallu's brother)
Amjad Khan as Shahani Seth / Jaswant
Pran as Jailer Raghuvir Singh (Shalini's estranged father)
Purnima as Shalini Step Mother
K.N. Singh as Convict
Sajjan as 2nd Defense Attorney
Murad as IGP Officer
Sudhir as Rawat
Baby Khushboo as Rina ,Shalini's Step Sister
Brahmachari as Gopal
Ram Sethi as Crippled Prisoner
Brahm Bhardawaj as Judge
Ranjit Chowdhry as Boot polisher
Yunus Parvez as Abdul, Factory Mill Worker
Dev Kumar as Convict
Hiralal as Convict
Jagdeep as car dealer
Bob Christo as Michael
Gajanan Jagirdar as Kallu defence Lawyer
Raza Murad as Public Prosecutor
Mushtaq Khan as Ram Deen
Anjan Srivastav as Constable in Central Jail (Guest Role)

Soundtrack
Lyrics were by Majrooh Sultanpuri.

Notes
 The song "Jahan Teri Yeh Nazar Hai" influenced the song "Palat – Tera Hero Idhar Hai", featured in the 2014 film Main Tera Hero.
 This film was remade in Sinhalese as Jaya Apatai in 1986, but with different songs. This version stars Vijaya Kumarathunga, Geetha Kumarathunga and Cleetus Mendis.

References

External links
 

Films scored by R. D. Burman
1981 films
1980s Hindi-language films
Hindi films remade in other languages
1980s masala films